HEARDing Cats Collective is a St Louis based organization dedicated to the promotion of artists founded by Rich O'Donnell and Anna Lum, Mike Murphy, and Ryan Harris in 2009.  HEARDing Cats promotes and presents and wide variety of improvisation music, film, poetry, performance art, and dance.

Articles & Reviews
HEARding Cats will start off the year with a bang by Thomas Crone, Special to the St Louis Beacon - published January 13, 2010
The Cat's Meow: The HEARding Cats collective brings new sounds to St. Louis  by Ryan Wasoba The Riverfront Times published -Wednesday, March 17, 2010
"An Intergalactic Happening" Presented by HEARding Cats Collective - St Louis Chinese American News
Got a minute? Dance! by Calvin Wilson St Louis Today Friday, October 1, 2010

References

External links
 

Music organizations based in the United States
Organizations established in 2009
Collectives
Community building
Companies based in St. Louis
Organizations based in St. Louis
Non-profit organizations based in St. Louis